Paul Carrington Edmunds (November 1, 1836 – March 12, 1899) was a Virginia lawyer, Confederate soldier and politician who served in the Virginia Senate and in the U.S. representative from Virginia.

Early and family life
Born at "Springwood," a plantation near Halifax Court House, Virginia, to the former Mildred Carrington Coles (1820–1880) and her husband John Richard Edmunds (1812–1873), he could trace his descent from the First Families of Virginia. His brothers were Henry Edmunds (1842–1907) and Edward Carrington Edmunds (1857–1916). After a private teacher, Edmunds attended the University of Virginia at Charlottesville. After graduating in 1855, he began studying law at the College of William and Mary in Williamsburg, Virginia, from which he graduated in 1857.

He married Phoebe Ann Easley (1837-1898) and they had five sons: James Easley Edmunds (1860-1952), John Richard Edmunds (1863-1902), Paul Carrington Edmunds (1865-1915), William Holt Edmunds (1867–1949) and Henry Hurt Edmunds (1869–1958).

Career

He was admitted to the bar the same year and commenced practice in Jefferson City, Missouri. He returned to Virginia in 1859 and engaged in agricultural pursuits on his farm in Halifax County. He served as first lieutenant, Company A, Montague's battalion, in the Confederate States Army during the Civil War. Halifax County voters elected him to the Virginia State senate, where he served two terms, from 1881 to 1888. He served as delegate to the Democratic National Convention in 1884.
Edmunds was elected as a Democrat to the Fifty-first, Fifty-second, and Fifty-third Congresses (March 4, 1889 – March 3, 1895). He served as chairman of the Committee on Expenditures in the Department of Agriculture (Fifty-second and Fifty-third Congresses). He declined to be a candidate for renomination in 1894. He died in Houston, Virginia near Halifax, March 12, 1899.

Death and legacy

He was interred in the family plot at St. John's Churchyard, Halifax, Virginia.

Elections

1888; Edmunds was elected to the U.S. House of Representatives with 55.6% of the vote, defeating Republican Patrick H. Caull and Independent Democrat Samuel T. Hopkins.
1890; Edmunds was re-elected with 92.8% of the vote, defeating Republican William J. Shelburne.
1892; Edmunds was re-elected with 58.42% of the vote, defeating Populist Thomas E. Cobbs.

Sources

References

1836 births
1899 deaths
Democratic Party Virginia state senators
Democratic Party members of the United States House of Representatives from Virginia
Confederate States Army officers
19th-century American politicians
People from Halifax, Virginia